Nicolaj Beier Køhlert (born 21 January 1993) is a Danish footballer who last played for Brabrand IF. He has played for the youth team of Premier League club Liverpool.

Career
Køhlert began his career with local side Esbjerg at the age of 15 in 2008; he spent a year there before joining Liverpool in England; during his time in Liverpool, Køhlert played for the reserves and under-18 sides but failed to make a first team appearance. In summer 2011, Køhlert left Liverpool to join Scottish side Rangers on a two-year deal, he played in the reserves during his six-month stay at the club but after Rangers entered administration.

Køhlert returned to Denmark to join  Silkeborg on a free transfer. He didn't make is debut for Silkeborg until 17 March 2013, when he came on as an 83rd-minute substitute for Jesper Bech in a 1–0 defeat against Randers. His second appearance came in April again as a substitute this time replacing Jeppe Illum in the 72nd minute. Køhlert played another seven league matches, all substitute appearances.

In spring 2014 Køhlert was a regular at the midfield in Silkeborg IF, and he played an important part in their promotion to the Superleague.

In November 2015 Køhlert signed a new -year contract with Silkeborg IF.

International career
Køhlert has represented Denmark at various youth levels.

References

External links
 

1993 births
Living people
Danish men's footballers
Association football midfielders
Silkeborg IF players
NSÍ Runavík players
Faroe Islands Premier League players
Danish Superliga players
Danish 1st Division players